This is a list of mayors of Olten, Canton of Solothurn, Switzerland. The mayor of Olten (Stadtpräsident von Olten) chairs the city council (Stadtrat). The mayor is named Stadtpräsident since 1993, Stadtammann before. From 1817 to 1830, two officials alternated annually the functions of Stadtammann and Stadthalter (stadtholder).

References 

 Stadtarchiv Olten

Olten
Mayors of Grenchen, List
People from Olten
Lists of mayors (complete 1900-2013)